Hematite is an unincorporated community located in the town of Florence, Florence County, Wisconsin, United States.

History
The community was named for deposits of hematite iron ore in the area.

Notes

Unincorporated communities in Florence County, Wisconsin
Unincorporated communities in Wisconsin